Anton K. "Toni" Fritsch (10 July 1945 – 14 September 2005) was an Austrian footballer who later started a successful career in American football in the United States. He is distinguished as being the first Austrian to play in the National Football League (NFL). He is the only player in history to win professional titles in both association football and American football: he won the Austrian League in 1964, 1967 and 1968, and the Super Bowl in 1972.

Association football career
Fritsch started to play association football at an early age and joined the Austrian record titleholder Rapid Vienna at the age of 13.  After six seasons, he was admitted to the club's first league team and played his first professional game in fall 1964.  During his time there, he played 123 games for Rapid, scoring 15 goals.  The team won the Austrian Championship three times (1964, 1967, 1968) and the Austrian Cup twice (1968, 1969).  He was described as a small, but extremely fast striker.

He played for the Austria national football team nine times.  He scored two goals when Austria defeated England 3-2 in London's Wembley Stadium on 20 October 1965, from which his nickname "Wembley-Toni" is derived.  This was only the third time for a continental team to beat England at home (following Hungary in 1953 and Sweden in 1959).

American football career

Dallas Cowboys
Fritsch was an association football (soccer) player who had never played a down of American football that the Dallas Cowboys converted into a place kicker. He was discovered by the team's scouts during a 1971 European tour in which they were looking for soccer-style kickers, which at the time was becoming popular in the National Football League. The first city they went to was Vienna and the first player they tried was Fritsch. Though hardly speaking any English at all, he decided to sign a contract as an undrafted free agent, move to the United States and join the team's training camp.

He was activated on 1 November after starting the season on the taxi squad, making his NFL debut against the St. Louis Cardinals, where he kicked a game-winning field goal in a 16–13 victory. That year, he suffered from a pulled hamstring muscle, the majority of the kicking duties went to Mike Clark. Fritsch did get a Super Bowl ring that season though, as he was on the roster of the Super Bowl VI-winning team.

In 1972 he made a club record 21 field goals, the first Austrian to do so. He also was the first known American football player to use a football style crossed-kick (now known as a rabona) late in the fourth quarter of the 1972 NFC Divisional playoffs, during an onside kick that contributed to a historic come from behind 30–28 victory against the San Francisco 49ers.

In 1974, he was lost for the season after injuring his knee and was replaced with Efren Herrera. The next year Herrera was placed on the injured reserve list and Fritsch came back to lead the NFL in points (104) and field goals (22, tied with Jan Stenerud). On 6 September, 1976, because of inconsistencies, he was traded to the San Diego Chargers in exchange for an eighth round draft choice (#208-Al Cleveland).

San Diego Chargers
With the San Diego Chargers he played in 5 games before being waived because he was inconsistent.

Houston Oilers
On 18 September 1977, he was signed as a free agent by the Houston Oilers and led the American Football Conference with a 75% field goal average. He was a part of the franchise's "Luv Ya Blue" period. In 1979, he received All-Pro and Pro Bowl honours. The next year, he led the league with a 79.2% field goal average. He was cut on 3 September 1982, after being beaten by Florian Kempf.

New Orleans Saints
Fritsch was signed as a free agent by the New Orleans Saints in 1982, to replace an injured rookie Morten Andersen and reuniting with his former head coach Bum Phillips. On 21 December, 1982, he announced his retirement. He finished with 758 points in 125 games during his 11-year NFL career, among those 317 for Dallas. He led the NFL in field goal percentage three times (1977, 1979, 1980).  His NFL record of having kicked a field goal in 13 straight playoff games was tied by Adam Vinatieri on 13 January, 2007.

Houston Gamblers (USFL)
In 1984, he came out of retirement to sign with the Houston Gamblers of the United States Football League and at the end of the season received All-League honours. He converted 42 of 50 field goals and 126 of 131 extra points for a total of 252 points in two seasons.

Personal life
After his retirement he worked in Europe as a sports commentator and in the world of finance, providing support to Austrian businessmen who wanted to settle in the United States. Even though Fritsch worked for his former Austrian football (soccer) club Rapid Vienna for one year in 1992–1993, he remained a resident of Houston throughout the rest of his life.

On 13 September 2005, Fritsch suddenly collapsed on a Vienna street after a meal at a restaurant.  He died of heart failure at the age of 60.

Honours
Austrian Football Bundesliga (3):
 1964, 1967, 1968
Austrian Cup (2):
 1968, 1969
Super Bowl (1):
 1972

References

External links
Biography at UEFA.com

Rapid profile at RapidArchiv.at

1945 births
2005 deaths
People from Bruck an der Leitha District
Association football forwards
Austrian footballers
Austria international footballers
American football placekickers
SK Rapid Wien players
Austrian Football Bundesliga players
Dallas Cowboys players
Houston Oilers players
New Orleans Saints players
San Diego Chargers players
American Conference Pro Bowl players
Austrian players of American football
Houston Gamblers players
Austrian expatriate sportspeople in the United States
Footballers who switched code
Sportspeople from Lower Austria
Footballers from Lower Austria
Association football players that played in the NFL